Lourdes High School is a Catholic high school located in Rochester, Minnesota. It is a part of the Rochester Catholic School system and is located in the Roman Catholic Diocese of Winona.

Background
Lourdes High School (LHS) was initially for girls only and went coeducational in 1925 when nearby boys-only Heffron High School closed. When the school relocated to a location on Center Street in 1941 it was renamed Lourdes High School. It moved to a site near 19th Street and Valley High in 2013.

Administration

Dennis L. Nigon, Principal of Lourdes High School from 1987 to 2007, became President of Rochester Catholic Schools in 2007. Mr. Nigon has 39 years of experience in Catholic high schools, and is in charge of the Lourdes Building Our Future project, to build a new facility for Lourdes High School.

Academic performance

LHS uses modular scheduling, students usually having classes into 36-minute class periods, with each class meeting about four of five days of the school week.

Lourdes High School has additional academic requirements beyond those commonly found at public high schools.

Lourdes students averaged a score of 26 on the ACT examination in the 2006–2007 academic year, meaning that the average Lourdes' student scored higher than 80% of national ACT takers.

Extracurricular activities

Math League
The Lourdes High School Math League in 2008 won first place in the Hiawatha Division, as well as attending the State Competition on March 12, 2007, taking second place in the Small Schools Division.  LHS student, Patti Geisler, won first place of all high schools in the division for highest individual score. 6 of the top 10 students of all high schools in 2008 were from Lourdes high school. (Post Bulletin, page A4 February 15, 2008)

Science Club
The science club was established around 2005. The club is made up of students dedicated to increasing their knowledge of science. In 2007, the club formed its second team to take to the Envirothon Competition. After taking second place in the regional competition, the team went on to the state tournament. In 2010, the team finished fourth in the regional competition by one point. That team was led by Taylor Nelson and Andrew Lose.

Chess Club
Lourdes also boasts the city's top ranked high school chess team after defeating local rival Century High School in the 2008 city championship while going on to finish 7th in the state competition.

Athletics

Football
In 2006, the Lourdes varsity football team advanced to the semi-finals of the state tournament. The current head coach is Mike Kesler. The first year of Kesler's coaching career was a 2–7 season. But every year since has been a successful winning season making the state tournament three straight years in 06, 07, and 08.

In November 2010, Rochester Lourdes won the Minnesota State Class 3A football title with a convincing 42–13 win over Holy Family. Lourdes finished the season undefeated.

Soccer
In 1997, Lourdes had a boys soccer team for the first time. The Lourdes boy soccer team won the Minnesota State Soccer Championship for Class A in 1998 and 1999.  In 1995, Tom Kane, the current varsity coach for boys soccer at Lourdes, campaigned heavily for a school-sanctioned team.

The 1998 Boys team (the first out-state Minnesota soccer team to win state) beat LaCresent (4–3), Mankato West (2–0) and Caledonia (2–0 section championship game) on their way to state. At state, Lourdes came back from a 2–0 deficit to win 3–2 against Benilde-St. Margaret's in overtime in the state quarterfinals. They then proceeded to beat Duluth Marshall 1–0 to claim the championship.

The 2006–2007 season found Lourdes falling to Benilde-St. Margaret's 2–5 in the semi finals and tying Totino-Grace 1–1 for third place.

Ice hockey
In the 1960s, Gene Campbell and Ken Johannson were the inaugural coaches for the boys' hockey program.

References

External links
 

Roman Catholic Diocese of Winona-Rochester
Catholic secondary schools in Minnesota
Schools in Olmsted County, Minnesota
Educational institutions established in 1877
Lourdes
1877 establishments in Minnesota